Paolo Giovannelli (born 1 October 1960 in Cecina) is a retired Italian professional footballer who played as a midfielder.

Club career
Throughout his club career, Giovannelli played 11 seasons (172 games, 12 goals) in the Italian Serie A for A.S. Roma, Pisa Calcio, Ascoli Calcio 1898 and A.C. Cesena.

He is mostly remembered by A.S. Roma fans for his winning goal that he scored on 2 March 1980 in a Derby della Capitale game against S.S. Lazio; he scored from a free-kick with five minutes remaining to play in the game, which was the only league goal he ever scored in his Roma career.

His tine at the club was hampered by a serious injury he suffered in 1981, which greatly limited his appearances in the next three seasons.

International career
Although Giovannelli was never capped for the Italy senior side, at international level, he represented the Italy U21 side on four occasions in 1982, and also took part at UEFA European Under-21 Football Championship with the team that year.

Honours
Roma
 Serie A champion: 1982–83.
 Coppa Italia winner: 1979–80, 1980–81.

1960 births
Living people
Italian footballers
Italy under-21 international footballers
Serie A players
Serie B players
A.S. Roma players
Pisa S.C. players
Ascoli Calcio 1898 F.C. players
A.C. Cesena players
Association football midfielders
People from Cecina, Tuscany
Sportspeople from the Province of Livorno
Footballers from Tuscany